Leionema obtusifolium,  is a small shrub with yellow-white flowers in terminal clusters at the end of branches.  It is endemic to Queensland.

Description
The branchlets are flattened with noticeable acute angles and a finely warty surface. Flowering occurs in spring.

Taxonomy
This species was first formally described in 1970 by Paul G. Wilson and gave it the name  Phebalium obtusifolium. In 1998 Paul G. Wilson changed the name to Leionema obtusifolium and the name change was published in the journal Nuytsia.

Distribution and habitat
This species has a restricted distribution, growing on sandstone hills in the Helidon and Ravensbourne areas of south-eastern Queensland.

Conservation status
Leionema obtusifolium is classified as "vulnerable" by the Government of Queensland Environment Protection and Biodiversity Conservation Act 1999.

References

External links

obtusifolium
Sapindales of Australia
Flora of Queensland
Taxa named by Paul G. Wilson